This is a list of radio stations in Lithuania.

Broadcast

Lithuanian
Pūkas traditional and wedding Lithuanian music
Lietus pop

Blues
Relax FM

Campus
Baltupių radijas
Start FM

Christian
Marijos radijas
Vilties radijas
XFM

Classical
LRT Klasika

Electronic
LRT Opus

Dance
Power Hit Radio
ZIP FM

Jazz
EASY FM
KTU radio Gaudeamus
Jazz FM
Pūkas 2
Užupio radijas

News
LRT radijas
Žinių radijas

Pop
European Hit Radio
Gold FM
Super FM
M-1
M-1 Plius
Radiocentras
Radio R Russian music hits

Regional
A2
Aukštaitijos radijas
FM 99
Geras FM
HOT FM
IR
Laluna
Mažeikiai FM
Mažeikių aidas
M FM
Neringa FM
Pulsas
Radijas 9
Raduga
Saulės radijas
Spindulys
Studio 7
TAU
Versmė
Znad Wilii Polish language radio station
Žemaitijos radijas
XXL FM

Various
Baltijos bangų radijas
Extra FM
Kelyje

Webcast-only
anotherfm.net
Dance Hit Radio
DSRock
Emigrantas Radio
Gaudeamus
IceFM
iLOUNGEradio
Lafesta
Mano Radijas
Organzza Radio
Tarakono Radijas
Tūso radijas
Play Radio
Radio Vilnius

External links
Communications Regulatory Authority of Lithuania
Radio and Television Commission of Lithuania
Lithuanian Radio Guide/Radijas internete

Radio
 
Lithuania